Amadgah Abyek (also Romanized as Āmādgāh Ābyeḵ) is a village in Ziaran Rural District, in the Central District of Abyek County, Qazvin Province, Iran. At the 2006 census, its population was 2,105, in 549 families.

References 

Populated places in Abyek County